Pogoń 1922 Żory is a Polish women's handball team, based in Żory.

See also
 Handball in Poland
 Sports in Poland

Polish handball clubs
Żory
Sport in Silesian Voivodeship